Heřmanice is a municipality and village in Havlíčkův Brod District in the Vysočina Region of the Czech Republic. It has about 50 inhabitants.

Administrative parts
The village of Bučovice is an administrative part of Heřmanice.

References

Villages in Havlíčkův Brod District